Get Over It is the fifth studio album by the hard rock band Mr. Big. It is their first studio album to feature guitarist Richie Kotzen.

Track listing

Personnel
Mr. Big
Eric Martin – lead & backing vocals
Richie Kotzen – guitars, backing vocals, co-lead vocals on "Static"
Billy Sheehan – bass guitar, backing vocals
Pat Torpey – drums, backing vocals

Production
 Pat Regan – producer, engineer, mixing
 Brad Vance – mastering

Charts

Certifications

References

External links
Heavy Harmonies page

1999 albums
Mr. Big (American band) albums
Atlantic Records albums